Dicky Cheung Wai-kin (born 8 February 1965) is a Hong Kong actor and singer.

Early childhood
Cheung grew up with a physically abusive father. His parents divorced when Cheung was 14. 

Cheung was educated in St Francis Xavier's College in Hong Kong. He became interested in acting when he was in elementary school, stemming from his interest in analyzing human behaviour. For example, he always loved being in crowded streets or buses, where he could observe people and hear conversations. In plays, he would work as director, actor, and scriptwriter.

In 1984, he won the TVB International Chinese New Talent Singing Championship. However, it was not a good start of his singing career. No record company wanted to sign a contract with him. So he changed his career path to acting. In 1985, he signed a contract with TVB. However, the following eight years he only acted in small parts until 1991 when he finally got the chance to be the main actor in the TVB drama called "Laoyou Guigui"("A Step Beyond"). Later, he gained the lead role in Journey to the West, where he gained many fans and supporters in Hong Kong.

Career
He entered show business in the early 1980s, signing a contract with television station TVB. He won the third annual New Talent Singing Awards in 1984. Up until the mid-90s, Cheung struggled for many years working as a low-paid actor, singer and appeared occasionally in films. It was not until his portrayal of the Monkey King character in the 1996 TVB drama Journey to the West, an adaptation of the classical Chinese novel Journey to the West, that his popularity began to skyrocket. A sequel to the TV adaptation was planned, but due to a contract dispute with TVB, Cheung left before production began. Benny Chan Ho Man took over the role of the Monkey King in the sequel. Cheung then went abroad to Taiwan to continue his career.

Cheung's most notable performance that made him famous was his portrayal of the Monkey King in the 1996 TVB adaptation of the classic Chinese tale Journey to the West. As well as being the lead character, Cheung also sang the theme song as well as many other songs throughout the series. This series was very popular during its run on TVB Jade, it was even dubbed in English and broadcast on TVB Pearl, the only TVB series to receive this treatment to date. Cheung was also due to play the Monkey King in the sequel. However, due to a dispute regarding the contract, the role was given to Benny Chan Ho Man.

He has appeared in many Taiwanese television productions since going to Taiwan. In 1999, TVB's rival station ATV acquired the Hong Kong broadcasting rights to his Taiwanese television series Young Hero Fong Sai Yuk. Cheung played Fong Sai Yuk, a character also portrayed by Jet Li in his film Fong Sai Yuk. The show was an instant hit in Hong Kong and managed to gain much higher ratings than TVB's own television series. The TVB series showing at that time was Dragon Love, starring Benny Chan Ho Man, who replaced Cheung in the Journey to the West sequel,

In one of the TV adaptations of Louis Cha's Wuxia novel The Deer and the Cauldron. Cheung played the anti-hero Wai Siu-Bo, a character previously portrayed by Tony Leung Chiu-Wai, Stephen Chow and Jordan Chan in many television and film adaptations, in The Duke of Mount Deer.

In 2001, Andy Lau's NMG production company produced another television adaptation of Journey to the West. Cheung was given a chance to once again portray the role in The Monkey King: Quest for the Sutra. The series was broadcast in 2002 on TVB. Although it received high ratings, many felt it was not as good as the 1996 version.

Cheung played Shun in Kung Fu Soccer, a young talented soccer player originated from rural Guangdong whose also excels in kungfu yet suffers from short term memory loss. The series was broadcast by TVB from December 2004 to January 2005, with Cheung sang the opening theme of the series.

After a 20-year absence, Cheung made his TVB comeback. He starred in TVB's 50th anniversary drama, The Learning Curve of a Warlord <大帥哥>, which was produced by Steven Tsui.

Personal life
At the end of 1997, Cheung met his wife Jess Zhang (Zhang Qian), an actress in China. They were filming in the same location on separate productions. They formally met each other when Jess was humming the tune of "哎呀哎呀親親你" (Aiya, Aiya, Kissing You) and did not know who originally sang the song nor realize the original singer was in her presence.  Their relationship then further developed when Cheung purchased a water bottle for Jess. In 2004，Cheung married Jess in Nanjing and had a separate wedding ceremony in Boracay in 2009.

Prior to his marriage with Jess, he was involved in brief relationships with the actresses Elvina Kong and Jessica Hsuan.

He has said that he would like to eventually leave the acting business and seriously consider doing something more meaningful in life such as volunteering to give back to the society.

Filmography

Television
 The Learning Curve of a Warlord (2018)
 Swordsman (2013)
 Heroes of Sui and Tang Dynasties 1 & 2 (2012)
 The Legend of Hundred Family Surnames (2011)
 The Next Magic (2011)
 Shi Da Qi Yuan (2008)
 The Kung Fu Master Wong Fei Hung (2008) – Wong Fei Hung
 Project A (2007)
 Ayo (2007)
 The Proud Twins (2005)
 Magic Chef (2005)
 The Royal Swordsmen (2005)
 The Luckiest Man (2005)
 The Legend of the Treasure Basin (2004)
 Kung Fu Soccer (2004)
 The Luckiest Man (2003)
 The Monkey King: Quest for the Sutra (2002) – Sun Wukong
 Mr. Winner (2002)
 Taiji Prodigy (2002)
 Smart Kid (2001)
 The New Adventures of Chor Lau-heung (2001)
 The Duke of Mount Deer (2000)
 Chess Warriors (1999)
 Swordsman I (1999)
 Young Hero Fang Shiyu (1999) – Fang Shiyu
 Happy Flying Dragon I, II, III (1997)
 The Witty Attorney (1997)
 Journey to the West (1996) – Sun Wukong
 The Buddy Gang (1995)
 "Money and Fame" (1992)
 Edge of Righteousness (1992)
 Wong Fei Hung Returns (1992) – Wong Fei Hung
 Mystery of the Twin Swords II (1992)
 Mystery of the Twin Swords (1991)
 The Little boy from China (1991)
 The Legend of the Book and the Sword (1987)

Films

References

External links
 
 JayneStars.com – English translated news about Dicky Cheung
 Dicky.cn (Chinese)

1965 births
Big Four (band) members
Cantopop singers
Hong Kong male film actors
Hong Kong male television actors
Hong Kong male singers
Hong Kong Mandopop singers
Hong Kong singer-songwriters
Living people
New Talent Singing Awards contestants
Male actors from Shanghai
20th-century Hong Kong male actors
21st-century Hong Kong male actors
Hong Kong male comedians